Original intent is a theory in law concerning constitutional and statutory interpretation. It is frequently used as a synonym for originalism; while original intent is indeed one theory in the originalist family, it has some salient differences which has led originalists from more predominant schools of thought such as original meaning to distinguish original intent as much as legal realists do.

Approach
Original intent maintains that in interpreting a text, a court should determine what the authors of the text were trying to achieve, and to give effect to what they intended the statute to accomplish, the actual text of the legislation notwithstanding. As in purposivism, tools such as legislative history are often used.

One example of original intent is in Freeman v. Quicken Loans Inc., [2012]. The plaintiffs took out mortgage loans from Quicken Loans. In 2008 they sued Quicken Loans arguing that that respondent had violated Real Estate Settlement Procedures Act (RESPA) Section 2607(b) by charging them fees for which no services were provided. The plaintiffs supported their allegation by referring to the  Department of Housing and Urban Development  (HUD) policy statement that says that §2607(b) “prohibit[s] any person from giving or accepting any unearned fees, i.e., charges or payments for real estate settlement services other than for goods or facilities provided or services performed.”

Justice Scalia delivered the opinion of the court that RESPA Section 2607(b) was not violated by referencing that RESPA included a directive that HUD make a report to Congress regarding the need for further legislation in the area, so the original intent was to pass new legislature if it was needed, so the Supreme Court ruled in favor of the defendant.

Problems

Originalist criticisms of original intent proponents (and some proposed rebuttals)
Despite the potential confusion of terms between the original intent and originalism, other schools of originalist thought have been as critical of original intent as non-originalists.
 Original intent presumes that there is a single, unified intent behind a text. In the case of the United States Constitution, the Philadelphia Convention was composed of over fifty men, who spent an entire summer compromising and arguing over provisions that were interpreted very differently the moment the Constitution's text became public. It is far from clear, therefore, that those fifty-plus men had – i.e., agreed upon – a single original intent of the text, or whether their purposes in drafting the Constitution were predicated on personal self-interest. (There is no meaning from an originalist perspective without intent. That is, it is impossible to interpret anything which has no intent, according to originalism. Lawmakers either have no intent, one intent, or multiple intents. But these multiple intents are always consistent, otherwise the law can have no meaning.)
 Even if the convention did have a single, unified intent, it is unclear how it could reliably be determined from two centuries' distance. (That may be, but what can often be determined is that an interpretation being considered is inconsistent with the original intent even though the exact intent is not known.)
 Many of the clauses of the Constitution are relative, and thus specifically defy any claim that it is possible to divine a single, indisputable outcome to any specific problem or dispute. Key passages in the Constitution were originally cast as flexible evaluations, such as "due process", a phrase that suggests the definitions, requirements and dimensions of court or other governmental proceedings sufficient in any given context to permit citizens to be deprived of their rights were never intended to be fixed forever. (A single indisputable decision is never the outcome using any other jurisprudence. This is an argument against making any decision at all. The judge must merely make his best effort to decide in a manner which is consistent with the intent of the framers or authors of legislation, so far as they can ascertain it.)
 In the case of US federal law, law is made by majority vote in two chambers, and is then signed by the president. Five hundred and thirty-six  people are therefore potentially involved in this process, and not one of them needs to share the same intentions as any other of them in order to play their part in ratifying the bill. They need only vote; their vote will count the same if they share the same intent as their colleagues, if they do not share the intent of their colleagues, and indeed, if they have no particular intention, and are voting solely because their party whip handed them a note saying "be on the Senate floor at 9:36 pm and say 'Aye'." Their vote will count even if they are falling-down drunk or if they have not even read the bill under consideration. All of which is to say that giving effect to the intent of the legislature not only presumes that there is a singular intent – no less dubious an assertion where statutes are concerned than where the Constitution is – but the very diversity of these bodies may permit a judge to corrupt their inquiry by finding a floor statement or committee report which suggests an intent that the judge thinks would be a good result. (The intent can be ascertained so far as the authors of the legislation or other less authoritative contemporary sources said what it was)
 Original intent may fall afoul of formalist theories of law, which explicitly decline interest in how a law is made, an inquiry which is obviously at the core of an original intent inquiry.

 Original intent cannot be reconciled against textualism. Most of those who are originalists in Constitutional matters are also textualists in statutory matters, and textualism rejects the value of the intentions of the legislature in passing a text. If one adopts originalism as an "error-correcting lens which fits over textualism to account for the passage of time", one cannot adopt an originalist theory which is incoherent with the underlying textualism.

Other schools of thought
In Canada, the predominant school of thought for legal interpretation is the living tree doctrine, under which interpretations can evolve along with the society, to deal with new conditions that were different or did not exist when the Constitution was framed.

See also
 Judicial activism

Notes

  See, e.g., Black's Law Dictionary, 6th. ed., p. 1133
  Beal, Cardinal Rules of Legal Interpretation p. 257 ("in construing an Act of Parliament where the intention of the legislature is declared by the preamble, we are to give effect to that preamble to this extent, namely, that it shows us what the legislature are intending; and if the words of enactment have a meaning which does not go beyond that preamble, or which may come up to the preamble, in either case we prefer that meaning to one showing an intention of the legislature which would not answer the purposes of the preamble, or which would go beyond them.  To that extent only is the preamble material. – Overseers of West Ham v. Iles (1883), 8 App. Cas. 386, at pp 388, 389; 52 L. J. Q. B. 650, Lord Blackburn" see also "You cannot resort to the preamble to ascertain the intention of an Act, unless there is an ambiguity in the enacting part." – Taylor v. Corporation of Oldham (1876), 4 Ch. D. 395, at p. 404, Jessel, M. R. on the same page).
  Zander, Law-Making Process p. 166 ("It is for the courts to construe [the statute's] words and it is the court's duty in so doing to give effect to the intention of Parliament in using those words").
  See, e.g., Bork, The Tempting of America, p. 144 ("If someone found a letter from George Washington to Martha telling her that what he meant by the power to lay taxes was not what other people meant, that would not change our reading of the Constitution in the slightest.... Law is a public act. Secret reservations or intentions count for nothing. All that counts is how the words used in the Constitution would have been understood at the time."); Scalia, Speech at CUA, 14 October 1996 ("You will never hear me refer to original intent, because as I say I am first of all a textualist, and secondly an originalist. If you are a textualist, you don't care about the intent, and I don't care if the framers of the Constitution had some secret meaning in mind when they adopted its words.")
  Cf. The Federalist Papers and The Complete Anti-Federalist
  See Charles Beard's 1913 An Economic Interpretation of the Constitution of the United States.
  In the documentary Fahrenheit 9/11, for example, John Conyers a Democratic member of the House responds incredulously to the filmmaker's inquiry as to whether anyone in Congress read the Patriot Act, stating "We don't read most of the bills. Do you really know what that would entail if we were to read every bill that we passed?" John Conyers on Reading Bills in Congress, Fahrenheit 9/11 trailer, 1:00 minute mark 
  This is precisely why textualists reject the use of legislative history in determining the meaning of a statute.
  See, e.g., Scalia, A Matter of Interpretation.

Philosophy of law
Intention